, known mononymously as Riri (stylized as RIRI or RiRi), is a Japanese singer-songwriter. After winning a talent contest and being scouted by The Mic-a-holics, the agency that represents Japanese-American singer-songwriter Ai, her debut extended play I Love to Sing was released in 2016 by the agency. Her second EP Rush was released in 2017, debuting and peaking at number 70 on the Billboard Japan Hot Albums Chart. Shortly after, Sony Music Entertainment Japan offered Riri a record contract and she soon was signed to Sony Music Associated Records. Her eponymous major label debut studio album was released in 2018, followed by her second studio album Neo later that year. Riri's fourth EP, the Summertime EP was released in May 2019, serving as her final release under Sony Music Japan.

Early life and career 

Riri started singing at 4 years old, inspired by American R&B acts such as Mariah Carey, Beyoncé and Whitney Houston. In 2011, she won the Next Generation Star singing competition hosted by David Foster. In 2012 she attended The Dream Support Project Award in New York City, making it her first performance in the US. In July 2016, she debuted officially as a singer under The Mic-a-holics Inc., which also manages singer-songwriter Ai, who produced her first official single, "Gold" and her debut extended play, I Love to Sing. In 2017, her second EP Rush was released.

In 2018, Riri signed with Sony Music Japan sublabel Sony Music Associated Records and released her eponymous major label debut studio album. The album was produced by American producers Brian Soko and Damon Sharpe, who also worked with Ariana Grande and Beyoncé. On November 28, 2018, RIRI released her second studio album Neo. It includes the single "Maybe One Day" and a Japanese cover of Zedd's song "Stay". A collaboration song with Japanese R&B singer Shimizu Shota and American rapper Saweetie are included on the album as well.

On May 22, 2019 Riri released the Summertime EP which includes the singles, "Summertime" a collaboration with Japanese rappers Keiju and Nariaki Obukuro, "Luv Luv" which features South Korean rapper Junoflo and a cover of "Dilemma" with Japanese rapper JP the Wavy. She also recorded a Japanese version of "Circle of Life" for the local release of The Lion King. She was featured in the Japanese dub of Cats as the voice of Bombalurina.

By the end of 2019, Riri's contract with Sony Music expired, leading to her independently releasing the single "Episode 0" in 2020. 

On April 7, 2021, Riri released a single titled "Wheel of Fortune", which was composed by her and Uta. On May 26, an English version of the song was released with its own music video. In July 2021, Riri announced her next single, "Luv Déjà vu". It was released on July 21.

Discography

Albums

Studio albums

Extended plays

Singles

As lead artist

As featured artist

Promotional singles

Notes

References 

1999 births
Living people
Japanese women singer-songwriters
Japanese singer-songwriters
Japanese rhythm and blues singers
J-pop singers
Contemporary R&B singers
21st-century Japanese singers
21st-century Japanese women singers
Sony Music Entertainment Japan artists